Ihab el-Sherif (January 1954 – July 2005) served as Egypt's ambassador to Iraq until Iraqi kidnappers murdered him in July 2005. He previously served as Egypt's chargé d'affaires to Israel.

Kidnapping and death
El-Sherif was abducted on July 3, 2005, when he stepped out of his car in Baghdad to buy a newspaper.

The al-Qaeda in Iraq organization, run by Abu Musab al-Zarqawi, once Iraq's most wanted militant, posted a message on the internet on July 6, 2005, which stated: "The Islamic court of the al-Qaeda Organization in the Land of Two Rivers has decided to refer the ambassador of the state of Egypt, an ally of the Jews and the Christians, to the mujahideen so that they can execute him." Earlier that day, the group had posted photos of Sherif's identification cards.

On July 7, 2005, al-Qaeda in Iraq uploaded to the internet a video of Sherif blindfolded, giving his name and address and acknowledging that he once worked as a diplomat in Israel. The video was accompanied by an announcement that el-Sherif had been killed, claiming that "the verdict of God against the ambassador of the infidels, the ambassador of Egypt, has been carried out". His death was subsequently confirmed by the Egyptian government.

El-Sherif was the highest-level hostage executed since Coalition-led forces ousted Iraqi President Saddam Hussein in 2003. The slaying was part of a campaign to deter other nations from expanding diplomatic ties with Iraq's new government. Egyptian President Hosni Mubarak stated that the murder would not deter Egypt from supporting Iraq.

Arrests
On July 14, 2005, United States troops arrested Khamis Farhan Khalaf and al-Fahdawi, the alleged al-Qaida leader suspected to be responsible for Sherif's murder.

See also
List of kidnappings
List of solved missing person cases
List of unsolved murders

References

External links
Department of Defense press release
  by Leon Charney on The Leon Charney Report. October 28, 2001

1954 births
2005 deaths
2000s missing person cases
2005 murders in Iraq
21st-century Egyptian diplomats
Ambassadors of Egypt to Iraq
Foreign hostages in Iraq
Formerly missing people
Egyptian people taken hostage
Egyptian people murdered abroad
Male murder victims
Missing person cases in Iraq
People murdered in Iraq
Unsolved murders in Iraq
Kidnapped diplomats